Angelli Nesma Medina (born in Mexico) is a Mexican producer.

Filmography

Awards and nominations

References

External links

Mexican telenovela producers
Living people
Year of birth missing (living people)